This is a list of the prime ministers of Canada by their academic degrees. The following list does not include honorary degrees conferred to the prime minister.

Canada 
Academic